The Rabnitzbach (also Rabnitz) is a river of Styria, Austria, one of the source rivers of the Rába (Raab).

The Rabnitzbach originates near mount Schöckl and flows in south-east direction to Gleisdorf where it merges with the Rába.

The water has Grade A quality and is one cleaner waters of Styria. It is rich on fishes. The normally harmless river can very quickly become a flood hazard and has already been a threat several times. Dangerous points have been mitigated without causing significant damage to nature.

References

Rivers of Styria
Graz Highlands
Rivers of Austria